There are at least 22 named / registered  lakes and reservoirs in Washington County, Arkansas.

Lakes
Lake Wilson, el.

Reservoirs

Adams Lake, el.  
Arbor Acres Lake, el.  
Arkansas Noname 350 Reservoir, el.  
Beaver Lake, el.  
Broccardo Lake, el.  
Budd Kidd Lake, el.  
Cantrell Lake, el.  
Double Bar Ranch Lake, el.  
Heda Lake, el.  
Heflin Lake, el.  
Kinion Lake, el.  
Lake Elmdale, el.  
Lake Fayetteville, el.  
Lake Lucille, el.  
Lake Prairie Grove, el.  
Lake Sequoyah, el.  
Lake Weddington, el.  
Lincoln Lake, el.  
Meadows Lake, el.  
Rodgers Lake, el.  
Tenenbaum Lake, el.

See also
 List of lakes in Arkansas

Notes

Bodies of water of Washington County, Arkansas
Washington